Niederstriegis is a former municipality in the district of Mittelsachsen, in Saxony, Germany. With effect from 1 January 2013, it has been incorporated into the town of Roßwein.

References 

Former municipalities in Saxony